The 133rd Street station was a station on the IRT Third Avenue Line in the Bronx, New York City. It was originally opened on May 17, 1886 by the Suburban Rapid Transit Company, and was the first stop in the Bronx after crossing the Harlem River. It had two tracks and one island platform, and was also the terminus of the Third Avenue Line until May 23, 1886 when it was expanded to 143rd Street. Besides Third Avenue Line trains, it was also served by trains of the IRT Second Avenue Line until June 11, 1940, when Second Avenue service ended. This station closed on May 12, 1955, with the ending of all service on the Third Avenue El south of 149th Street.

References

 

IRT Second Avenue Line stations
IRT Third Avenue Line stations
Railway stations in the United States opened in 1886
Railway stations closed in 1955
1886 establishments in New York (state)
1955 disestablishments in New York (state)
Former elevated and subway stations in the Bronx
Mott Haven, Bronx